The Morocco Billie Jean King Cup team represents Morocco in the Billie Jean King Cup tennis competition and are governed by the Fédération Royale Marocaine de Tennis.  They have not competed since 2003.

History
Morocco competed in its first Fed Cup in 1966, but did not compete again until 1995.  Their best result was winning Group II in 1999 earning promotion to Group I.

See also
Fed Cup
Morocco Davis Cup team

External links

Billie Jean King Cup teams
Fed Cup
T